The Laboratori Nazionali di Legnaro (Legnaro National Laboratories, LNL) is one of the four major research centers of the Italian National Institute for Nuclear Physics (INFN). The primary focus of research at this laboratory is in the fields of nuclear physics and nuclear astrophysics, where five accelerators are currently used. It is one of the most important facilities in Italy for research in these fields. The main future project of the laboratory is the Selective Production of Exotic Species (SPES), in which various radionuclides will be produced for research and medicinal purposes.

History
The establishment of a laboratory in Legnaro was first suggested in 1956 to promote nuclear physics research in Italy in addition to previous work in particle physics. In 1959, the University of Padua decided that a new laboratory would be built near Legnaro, rather than install new equipment in older facilities. The laboratory was founded in 1960 by physicist Antonio Rostagni and research commenced within the next year. After initial investigations demonstrated the conceived role of the Legnaro Laboratories in nuclear physics research, the facility became integrated into the INFN in 1968.

In subsequent years, several accelerators were newly installed or upgraded. The original CN accelerator, whose operations commenced with the opening of the laboratory, was upgraded to allow use and study of heavier ions. More advanced facilities were installed in the next decades: the XTU Tandem accelerator in 1981 (inaugurated in 1982) and the Linear Superconducting Accelerator (ALPI) in 1991. The installation of new facilities enabled more advanced studies to be performed at the Legnaro laboratories, increasing its importance in international research in nuclear physics.

Currently, most work at the Legnaro National Laboratories involves studies of nuclear structure, nuclear reactions, and gamma-ray spectroscopy; the last was internationally recognized in the 1990s. The recent focus of the Legnaro Laboratories, and the main future project, is SPES (Selective Production of Exotic Species). A new accelerator for the production of radioactive ion beams has been under construction since 2007, and the alpha phase of the project, featuring a new cyclotron, was inaugurated in December 2016. Subsequent beta, gamma, and delta phases are planned, approved, and funded by INFN and the Italian government; it will be possible to synthesize new isotopes and mass produce medically useful isotopes once they are completed.

Facilities and projects

Accelerators
There are six accelerators in operation at the Legnaro National Laboratories:
 CN: installed in 1961. Maximum energy reached for beams was 7 MeV, but nowadays run in 5.57 MeV energy. 7 meter tall (vertically installed) electrostatic accelerator.
 AN 2000: installed in 1971, 2 MeV beams. Electrostatic accelerator.
 XTU-TANDEM (or TANDEM-XTU): inaugurated 1982. Beam energy few hundred MeV. Electrostatic accelerator.
 ALPI (Acceleratore Lineare Per Ioni, Linear Superconducting Accelerator): Started operation in 1991. A superconducting cryogenic linear accelerator. Boosts beams from the TANDEM-XTU and PIAVE accelerators.
 PIAVE (Positive Ion Accelerator for Very Low velocity ions): Entered operation in late 2014. Superconducting linear accelerator used as injector to ALPI. A few meters in length.
 P70 cyclotron: inaugurated 2 December 2016. Part of the SPES project.

All accelerators are used to accelerate various ions for nuclear physics purposes.

AURIGA

The Legnaro National Laboratories are the site of AURIGA, a gravitational wave detector for astrophysical gravitational waves research. It became operational in 2004, and has been continuously in operation since then. In 2016, it was proven that the AURIGA resonant mass detector is sufficiently sensitive for dark matter searches, and perhaps more suitable than more modern detectors such as LIGO. The experiment is closed and the AURIGA antenna is an exhibit at LNL (since April 2021).

SPES
The SPES (Selective Production of Exotic Species) project involves the construction of several new accelerators specially designed for the production of radioisotopes. In the beta phase, fission at 1013 fissions per second and fragmentation of uranium will be studied to yield exotic neutron-rich isotopes and produce beams with these isotopes at higher intensities than those currently available. These include nuclei near the nuclear drip lines and shell closures that play an important role in the astrophysical r-process. A variety of medically useful radioisotopes will also be mass produced as part of the project's gamma phase. By 2017, significant progress was made on the construction of the SPES facility; the first beams of exotic isotopes are expected to be available in late 2019.

GAMMA experiment

The GAMMA experiment is underway at several European laboratories including the Legnaro National Laboratories. It uses gamma-ray spectroscopy to study the structure of light nuclei, as well as their unbound states and roles in nucleosynthesis processes. At present, LNL is one of the facilities delivering stable ion beams, though the development of SPES will also allow contribution of high-intensity radioactive ion beams. 

The major experiment installed in the laboratories are PRISMA (heavy ion magnetic spectrometer, with trajectory reconstruction system), GALILEO (Hyper pure Germanium gamma ray detector system, with the possibility of scintillator expansion) and EXOTIC (light exotic beam production and study).

In 2022, the european AGATA system (Advanced Gamma Tracking Array) will be installed in the Tandem-Alpi-Piave complex and it will start a new data taking session. The Advanced Gamma Tracking Array will be coupled with the PRIMSA spectrometer and thanks to the new beam interconnection between Tandem-Alpi-Piave complex and the SPES project, AGATA system will be received exotic beams produced in the SPES facility.

See also
 Laboratori Nazionali del Gran Sasso
 Laboratori Nazionali di Frascati

References

Physics laboratories
Research institutes in Italy
Laboratories in Italy
1960 establishments in Italy